Shkëndija Durrës is an Albanian sports club based in Durrës, Albania. Its men's football team recently competed in the Albanian Third Division and the women's team has competed at the Albanian Women's National Championship as recently as 2015. Their home ground is the Bernardina Qerraxhia Sports Complex.

References 

Shkendija Durres
Football clubs in Durrës